Alison Rusher (born May 24, 1996) is an American rower. She competed in the women's quadruple sculls event at the 2020 Summer Olympics.

References

External links
 

1996 births
Living people
American female rowers
Olympic rowers of the United States
Rowers at the 2020 Summer Olympics
Rowers from Greater London
21st-century American women